Cycle and Carriage was a company, founded in 1899, and based in Singapore and Malaysia. Cycle and Carriage was one of the premier automotive groups in Singapore and was engaged in the retail, distribution and provision of after-sales service of Mercedes-Benz, Mitsubishi, Kia & Citroën motor vehicles. In 2002, it was integrated into the Jardine Matheson Group and is now named Jardine Cycle & Carriage.

History

Cycle and Carriage was founded by the Chua brothers in 1899 in Kuala Lumpur as Federal Stores.  The company distributed many products. It was listed on the Stock Exchange of Malaysia and Singapore in 1977 and was part of the Straits Times Index, before being delisted upon merger. After the merger, it is now listed under the name of Jardine Cycle & Carriage.

References

Defunct companies of Singapore
Retail companies established in 1899
1899 establishments in Asia
Retail companies disestablished in 2002
2002 disestablishments in Asia

ja:ジャーディン・サイクル・アンド・キャリッジ